Felix Delgado (1915–2001) was a Negro leagues baseball player.  He was born in Coamo City, Puerto Rico.  Delgado played for the New York Cubans, and later for the San Juan Senators.  His career lasted from 1933 to 1942.  He was later a major league scout for the Kansas City Athletics 1968 to 1970 and Milwaukee Brewers from 1970 to 1997, and scouted players like Félix Millán.

References

1915 births
2001 deaths
African-American baseball players
Kansas City Athletics scouts
Milwaukee Brewers scouts
New York Cubans players
Oakland Athletics scouts
Puerto Rican baseball players
People from Coamo, Puerto Rico